McKinley Dixon (born October 28, 1995) is an American musician from Richmond, Virginia.

Background 
Dixon was born on October 28, 1995 in Annapolis, Maryland. He attended Virginia Commonwealth University in Richmond, Virginia. Around this time, he released two studio albums, his debut Who Taught You to Hate Yourself? in 2016 and his second album, The Importance of Self Belief.

On May 7, 2021, Dixon released his third studio album, For My Mama and Anyone Who Look Like Her, which was met with critical acclaim. Lucy Shanker from Consequence gave the album an "A" rating calling the album "a work of art. It encompasses numerous genres; it's a jazz piece, it’s a marching band showcase, it’s a spoken word performance, it's a rap album. It's a stunning exploration of the Black experience." Kyle Kohner, writing for Exclaim! said o the album is "compellingly verbose and, at times, boastful rapping style, but he also wields an impressive level of lyrical complexity. The emcee operates with a film director's eye, one that places himself in the actor's shoes, often offering multi-pronged characters that aim to make sense of himself and those who look like him." On Beats Per Minute, Conor Lochrie described the album "an unfolding narrative which could be considered a thesis, Dixon emphasizes the commodification of Black art by White people: where Black art often seems like it has to have a greater point, a higher purpose – indulging in traumatic images of violence in racial horror, as in the above case – white people, contrastingly, get to make whatever art they wish."

In 2022, Dixon appeared in Soul Glo's track "Spiritual Level of Gang Shit" on their studio album Diaspora Problems. On March 7th, along with the release of his latest single, 'Run, Run, Run', Dixon announced his latest album, "Beloved! Paradise! Jazz!?", out June 2nd on City Slang. On the album title, Robin Murray from Clash explained, "The record borrows its title from a phrase used by the novelist Toni Morrison, and it points to the literary flair that underpins his work. Jazz meets hip-hop in a highly original lane, his work to date illuminates a talent that defies convention."

Discography

Studio albums 
 Who Taught You to Hate Yourself? (2016)
 The Importance of Self Belief (2018)
 For My Mama and Anyone Who Look Like Her (2021)

Extended plays 
 The House That Got Knocked Down (2020)

Singles 
 "Anasi, Anasi" (2019)
 "Sun Black" (2020)
 "Make a Poet Black" (2021)
 "Swangin'" (2021)
 "Chain Sooo Heavy" (2021)
 "Bless the Child" (2021)
 "Sun, I Rise" (2022)
 "Tyler, Forever" (2023)
 "Run, Run, Run" (2023)

References

External links 
 McKinley Dixon at Bandcamp

1995 births
Living people
People from Annapolis, Maryland
Musicians from Richmond, Virginia
Rappers from Maryland
Rappers from Virginia
Singers from Maryland
Singers from Virginia
21st-century African-American male singers
Virginia Commonwealth University alumni